John Daub is an American/Japanese YouTuber and Japan-based reporter who runs the YouTube channel ONLY in JAPAN, a documentary series focusing on Japanese culture, food, history and his travel around Japan.

YouTube series 
Following the Great Tohoku Earthquake on March 11, 2011, Daub decided to take his experience reporting for NHK World's Tokyo Eye program  to YouTube to help promote Japan after the misunderstandings about the country caused by incorrect portrayals in Western media, especially regarding Fukushima and Tohoku. He picked the name Only in Japan because it refers to the quirky and often ridiculous image of Japan portrayed on social and mass media, much of which was grossly misinterpreted. In the series, Daub visits all 47 prefectures of Japan covering a wide range of topics including Japanese food, culture, history, technology and tourist attractions.

One such video was "Highway through a Building Story" highlighting the ingenuity of threading a highway though a very thin building in Osaka, The video included the background on this unusual design choice and its history, before Daub drove through it to give viewers a unique perspective. It included inside shots and interviews and the video trended globally with 16 million views. The program is lauded for its high production quality. On February 28, 2013, Daub launched the WAO RYU!Only in Japan channel with the WAO Corporation. During his time as creator and producer, the channel amassed 1.35 million subscribers and 170,000,000 views, ranking in the top 100 YouTube channels in Japan.

In March 2017, Daub hitchhiked the length of Japan, sharing the experience via a new all mobile livestreaming channel called ONLY in JAPAN * GO which has 260,000 subscribers as of April 2021.

He collected the YouTube 1 Million subscriber award at the  YouTube FanFest Japan 2019 cementing him as one of the top YouTube creators in Japan. In 2020, Daub announced he was leaving WAO RYU!Only in Japan to launch his new channel ONLY in JAPAN * John Daub. The new channel has an animated opening created by American-owned, Tokyo-based animation studio D'art Shtajio. With the launch of the new channel, Daub collaborated with the Japan Hanabi Association to crowdfunded an event to help Japan's fireworks industry during the COVID-19 pandemic.

TV 
Daub has been a regular reporter for NHK World's Tokyo Eye program since November 2008 and has reported in over 50 episodes alongside host Chris Peppler to show the city's highlights through history, culture, and various attractions.

He has worked on Journeys in Japan, Destination Kansai, and has been a guest on many other NHK Programs.  He has also been a guest on Japanese news program TBS ひるおび! as an inbound tourism expert since 2015. He has appeared on numerous Japanese and international television and news programs promoting Japan.

Personal life 
Daub has lived in Japan since 1998 working as an English teacher for children until 2005. During that time, he lived in 16 different cities around Japan starting up new schools for an eikaiwa chain. He married a Japanese woman named Kanae and they have a son named Leo.

References

External links 
 

YouTube channels
American expatriates in Japan
American reporters and correspondents
1974 births
Living people